ISO 860 Terminology work – Harmonization of concepts and terms is an ISO standard that deals with the principles which are the basis upon which concept systems can be harmonized and with the development of harmonized terminologies, in order to improve the efficiency in interlinguistic communication.

This standard specifies a methodology for the harmonization of concepts, definitions, terms, concept systems, and term systems. It is a natural extension of ISO 704.

The standard addresses two types of harmonization: concept harmonization and term harmonization. Concept harmonization means the reduction or elimination of minor differences between two or more closely related concepts. Concept harmonization is not the transfer of a concept system to another language. It involves the comparison and matching of concepts and concept systems in one or more languages or subject fields.

Term harmonization refers to the designation of a single concept (in different languages) by terms that reflect similar characteristics or similar forms. Term harmonization is possible only when the concepts the terms represent are almost exactly the same. The standard contains a flow chart for the harmonization process and a description of the procedures for performing it.

Amendments
ISO 860:2007 specifies a methodological approach to the harmonization of concepts, concept systems, definitions and terms. It applies to the development of harmonized terminologies, at either the national or international level, in either a monolingual or a multilingual context. It replaces: ISO 860:1996

References
ISO Catalogue in the ISO website
ISO 860:2007 on ISO website

00860